Mary Richardson Kennedy (born Mary Kathleen Richardson; October 4, 1959 – May 16, 2012) was an American interior designer, architect, and philanthropist. She was a proponent of green building and was a co-founder of the Food Allergy Initiative, the largest fund for food allergy research in the United States. Her 2010 legal separation from her husband, Robert F. Kennedy Jr., was highly publicized. Her subsequent suicide in 2012 also received national media attention.

Early life 
Mary Kathleen Richardson was born on October 4, 1959, and was raised in Bayonne, New Jersey. Her father, John F. Richardson, was an attorney and a professor at Stevens Institute of Technology, who died when she was 12 years old.  Richardson's mother was Nancy Higgins, a public school English teacher. Richardson had four sisters and two brothers.

She attended The Putney School, where she became friends and roommates with Kerry Kennedy, the daughter of Robert F. Kennedy and Ethel Skakel Kennedy. She later roomed with Kerry Kennedy in college and served as her maid of honor at her wedding in 1990 to Andrew Cuomo.

Education 
Richardson attended Brown University and studied architectural design at the Rhode Island School of Design (RISD).

Her close friend Kerry Kennedy stated that Mary spent a semester working for the artist Andy Warhol in 1980.  While Edward Kennedy was running for president, Mary Richardson, then age 20, had raised donations of artwork from Warhol and other prominent artists in his network, including Rauschenberg, Lichtenstein, and Schnabel.

Career 
After studying architecture at RISD, Richardson lived in SoHo, Manhattan, in the 1980s, and was active in the bohemian culture.

In 1993, Richardson worked for the firm Parrish Hadley Design as an architectural designer. She was involved in the renovation of the Naval Observatory in Washington, DC, the official residence of the Vice President of the United States.  Her work involved green building practices and was certified through the Leadership in Energy and Environmental Design program. Following flood damage to her home in 2003, Richardson oversaw a massive salvage job and green rebuild project known as the Kennedy Green House Project.

In 1998, she co-founded the Food Allergy Initiative, the largest private fund for food allergy research in the United States.

Personal life 

Richardson married Robert F. Kennedy, Jr., the brother of Kerry Kennedy, on April 15, 1994, aboard a research vessel on the Hudson River. They had four children: Conor Richardson Kennedy, Kyra LeMoyne Kennedy, William Finbar Kennedy, and Aidan Caohman Vieques Kennedy.

On May 12, 2010, Robert F. Kennedy, Jr. filed for divorce from Richardson. Three days later, she was arrested and charged with driving under the influence. She reportedly struggled with alcoholism and substance abuse. A court ordered that full temporary custody of her children be granted to her estranged husband.

Death 
On May 16, 2012, Richardson was found dead at her home in Bedford, New York. Her death was ruled as a suicide by hanging. An autopsy report revealed that she had antidepressants in her blood system. Her funeral, organized by the Kennedy family, was held at St. Patrick Catholic Church in Bedford, New York. On May 21, 2012, a memorial service organized by the Richardson family was held at the Standard Hotel in Manhattan. A legal battle between her husband and her brother, Thomas W. Richardson, ensued over which family should have control over her remains.

References 

1959 births
2012 suicides
Mary
American women architects
American women interior designers
American women philanthropists
American Roman Catholics
American socialites
Brown University alumni
Rhode Island School of Design alumni
Suicides by hanging in New York (state)
Sustainable building in the United States
People from Bayonne, New Jersey
The Putney School alumni